Kerrigan Patrick Mahan (born January 27, 1955) is an American voice actor. He has had voice roles in Lensman, Zillion, Vampire Hunter D and Crying Freeman, as Goldar in Mighty Morphin Power Rangers and Power Rangers Zeo, Jeb the talking dog in VR Troopers, and the original Magna Defender in Power Rangers Lost Galaxy. He also played the voice role of Monitor Org in Power Rangers Wild Force.

Mahan has also been involved in theater work, directing Matty: An Evening With Christy Mathewson, a play based on the life of baseball player Christy Mathewson, who was portrayed by another voice actor, Eddie Frierson. He played the villain Clint on S.W.A.T.s "Omega One". He was also the director for two episodes of the English version of the TV series Grimm's Fairy Tale Classics.

Filmography

Anime

Animation

Live action

Films

Video games

Other dubs

References

External links 
 
 
 

1955 births
American male voice actors
Living people
Male actors from Los Angeles